Panzer Digest is a wargaming periodical published by Minden Games. It is published quarterly in a digest format. The digest is edited by Gary Graber.

History
The magazine first appeared in 2007. In 2009 it received a Charles S. Roberts Award for "best amateur magazine". The magazine has also received favourable notice on the Consimworld website.

Content
The magazine offers microgames, game reviews, and commentary on the board wargaming industry in the English-speaking world.

References

External links
Board Game Geek link

2007 establishments in Arizona
Quarterly magazines published in the United States
Magazines established in 2007
Magazines published in Arizona
Wargaming magazines